Le Crocodile (literally « The Crocodile », in English) was a cancelled film project of the French director Gérard Oury, which would have starred Louis de Funès (in the first attempt of the project) or Peter Sellers (in the second attempt) in the main role.

Plot 
Crochet (literally « Hook », in English) is the dictator of a South American (or a South European) country, where the economic meltdown, the deprivation of liberty and the rebellions are part of the daily lot. Suddenly, everybody betrays him: the Americans drop him, the money he hid in Switzerland disappears, and his wife has an affair with the chief of the country's police and wants to make his lover the new leader of the country. To regain his popularity, Crochet organizes false bombings against himself. But he doesn't know that his wife and her lover had prepared real attacks.

Planned cast 

 Louis de Funès as Crochet, the dictator (1st attempt)
 Peter Sellers as Crochet, the dictator (2nd attempt)
 Régine Crespin as Crochet's wife, who has an affair with the chief of the country's police
 Aldo Maccione as the chief of the country's police, and the lover of Crochet's wife
 Charles Gérard in an undefined role

Production 

Gérard Oury thought of a movie about the dictatorship after the success of his previous movie, The Mad Adventures of Rabbi Jacob, with Louis de Funès.

References

External links 
 

Military humor in film
Films directed by Gérard Oury
Articles needing translation from French Wikipedia
Culture articles needing translation from French Wikipedia
Cancelled films
French comedy films